Virola is a genus of medium-sized trees native to the South American rainforest and closely related to other Myristicaceae, such as nutmeg. Species are known commonly as epená, patricá, or cumala. They have glossy, dark green leaves and clusters of tiny yellow flowers, and may emit a pungent odor.

Traditional use
Several species of this genus have been used to create hallucinogenic snuff powders.

Chemical constituents
The tops of Virola oleifera have been shown to produce lignan-7-ols and verrucosin that have antifungal action regarding Cladosporium sphaerospermum in doses as low as 25 micrograms. Lignan-7-ols oleiferin-B and oleiferin-G worked for Cladosporium cladosporioides starting as low as 10 micrograms.

Species
About 76 species, including:

Virola aequatorialis
Virola albidiflora
Virola araujovii
Virola atopa
Virola bicuhyba
Virola boliviensis
Virola brachycarpa
Virola caducifolia
Virola calophylla (Spruce) Warb.,
Virola calophylloidea
Virola carinata
Virola coelhoi
Virola crebrinervia
Virola cuspidata
Virola decorticans
Virola divergens
Virola dixonii
Virola duckei
Virola elliptica
Virola elongata (syn. V. theiodora)
Virola flexuosa
Virola gardneri
Virola glaziovii
Virola glycycarpa
Virola guatemalensis
Virola guggnheimii
Virola incolor
Virola koschnyi
Virola kukachkana
Virola kwatae
Virola laevigata
Virola lepidota
Virola lieneana
Virola lorentensia (or V. loretensis)
Virola macrantha
Virola macrocarpa A.C. Sm.,
Virola malmei
Virola marlenei
Virola megacarpa A.H. Gentry
Virola melinonii
Virola merendonis
Virola michelii Heckel,
Virola micrantha
Virola minutiflora
Virola mocoa
Virola mollissima
Virola multicostata Ducke
Virola multiflora (Standl. ) A. C. Sm.,
Virola multinervia
Virola mycetis
Virola nobilis
Virola obovata
Virola officinalis
Virola oleifera
Virola panamensis
Virola papillosa
Virola parvifolia
Virola pavonis
Virola peruviana
Virola polyneura
Virola reidii
Virola rufula
Virola rugulosa
Virola schultesii
Virola schwackei
Virola sebifera
Virola sessilis
Virola steyermarkii
Virola subsessilis
Virola surinamensis (Rol. ex Rottb. ) Warb.,
Virola theiodora
Virola urbaniana
Virola venezuelensis
Virola venosa (Benth.) Warb.
Virola villosa
Virola warburgli
Virola weberbaueri

Gallery

Legal status

United States

Louisiana
Except for ornamental purposes, growing, selling or possessing Virola spp. is prohibited by Louisiana State Act 159.

See also
Myristica — some species of this genus have been reclassified into Virola.
 Ayahuasca
 Entheogen
 Psychedelic plants

References

Notes

General references
 Jonathan Ott – Shamanic Snuffs or Entheogenic Errhines (2001) 
 Richard Evans Schultes – Plants of the Gods (1992) 
 Erowid Virola Vault

External links
 
 Sura.ots.ac.cr: Virola koschnyi — photos and info.
 Gardening.eu: Info on Growing Virola

 
Myristicaceae genera
Flora of South America
Entheogens
Herbal and fungal hallucinogens
Medicinal plants of South America
Psychedelic tryptamine carriers